was a Japanese educator, athlete, and the founder of Judo. Along with Ju-Jutsu, Judo was one of the first Japanese martial arts to gain widespread international recognition, and the first to become an official Olympic sport. Pedagogical innovations attributed to Kanō include the use of black and white belts, and the introduction of dan ranking to show the relative ranking among members of a martial art style. Well-known mottoes attributed to Kanō include "maximum efficiency with minimum effort" ( seiryoku zen'yō) and "mutual welfare and benefit" ( jita kyōei).

In his professional life, Kanō was an educator. He played a key role in making judo and kendo part of the Japanese public school programs of the 1910s.

Kanō was also a pioneer of international sports. Accomplishments included being the first Asian member of the International Olympic Committee (IOC) (he served from 1909 until 1938); officially representing Japan at most Olympic Games held between 1912 and 1936; and serving as a leading spokesman for Japan's bid for the 1940 Olympic Games.

His official honors and decorations included the First Order of Merit and Grand Order of the Rising Sun and the Third Imperial Degree. Kanō was inducted as the first member of the International Judo Federation (IJF) Hall of Fame on 14 May 1999.

Early years

Childhood

Kanō Jigorō was born to a sake-brewing family in the town of Mikage, Japan (now within Higashinada-ku, Kobe).  The family sake brands included "Hakushika", "Hakutsuru", and "Kiku-Masamune". But Kanō's father Kanō Jirōsaku (née Mareshiba Jirōsaku) was an adopted son and he did not go into the family business. Instead he worked as a lay priest and as a senior clerk for a shipping line. Kanō's father was a great believer in the power of education, and he provided Jigorō, his third son, with an excellent education. The boy's early teachers included the neo-Confucian scholars Yamamoto Chikuun and Akita Shusetsu. Kanō's mother died when the boy was nine years old, and his father moved the family to Tokyo. The young Kanō was enrolled in private schools, and had his own English language tutor. In 1874 he was sent to a private school run by Europeans to improve his English and German language skills.

At the time of his adolescence, Kanō stood  but weighed only . He was frequently bullied at school due to this small size and his intellectual nature, to the point other students dragged him out of the school buildings to beat him, so he wished he were stronger in order to defend himself. One day, Nakai Baisei (a friend of the family who was a member of the shōguns guard), mentioned that jūjutsu was an excellent form of physical training, and showed Kanō a few techniques by which a smaller man might overcome a larger and stronger opponent. Seeing potential for self-defense on this, Kanō decided he wanted to learn the art, despite Nakai's insistence that such training was out of date and dangerous. Kanō's father also discouraged him from jūjutsu, as he ignored the bullying his son suffered, but after noting Kanō's deep interest of the art, he allowed him to train on condition Kanō would strive to master it.

Jūjutsu
When Kanō attended the Tokyo Imperial University in 1877, he started looking for jūjutsu teachers. He first looked for bonesetters, called seifukushi. His assumption was that doctors who knew the martial art were better teachers. His search brought him to Yagi Teinosuke, who had been a student of Emon Isomata in the Tenjin Shin'yō-ryū school of jūjutsu. Yagi, in turn, referred Kanō to Fukuda Hachinosuke, a bonesetter who taught Tenjin Shin'yō-ryū in a 10-mat room adjacent to his practice. Tenjin Shin'yō-ryū was itself a combination of two older schools: the Yōshin-ryū and Shin no Shindō-ryū.

Fukuda's training method consisted mostly of the student taking fall after fall for the teacher or senior student until he began to understand the mechanics of the technique. Fukuda stressed applied technique over ritual form. He gave beginners a short description of the technique and had them engage in free practice (randori) in order to teach through experience. It was only after the student had attained some proficiency that he taught them traditional forms (kata). This method was difficult, as there were no special mats for falling, only the standard straw mats (tatami) laid over wooden floors.

Kanō had trouble defeating Fukushima Kanekichi, who was one of his seniors at the school. Therefore, Kanō started trying unfamiliar techniques on his rival. He first tried techniques from sumo taught by a former practitioner named Uchiyama Kisoemon. When these did not help, he studied more, and tried a technique ("fireman's carry") that he learned from a book on western wrestling. This worked, and kataguruma, or "shoulder wheel", remains part of the judo repertoire, although at this moment the judo organizations of some countries prohibit this throw in competition judo.

 On 5 August 1879, Kanō participated in a jūjutsu demonstration given for former United States president Ulysses S. Grant. This demonstration took place at the home of the prominent businessman Shibusawa Eiichi. Other people involved in this demonstration included the jūjutsu teachers Fukuda Hachinosuke and Iso Masatomo, and Kanō's training partner Godai Ryusaku. Fukuda died soon after this demonstration, at the age of 52. Kanō began studying with Iso, who had been a friend of Fukuda. He was known for excellence in kata, and was also a specialist in atemi, or the striking of vital areas. In Iso's method, one began with kata and then progressed to free fighting (randori). Due to Kanō's intense practice and his solid grounding in the jujitsu taught by Fukuda, he was soon an assistant at Iso's school. In 1881, Fukuda's widow gave the scrolls of the school to Kanō, then 21 years old. Some popular works suggest that Kanō obtained a teaching license in this school, but this has not been documented: no Tenjin Shin'yō-ryū certificate(s) with Kanō's name visible is depicted anywhere in the Kōdōkan museum or in any published source. Neither is such rank specified in any authentic Tenjin Shin'yō-ryū archival documents.

While under Iso's tutelage, Kanō witnessed a demonstration by the Yōshin-ryū jūjutsu teacher Totsuka Hikosuke and later took part in randori with members of Totsuka's school. Kanō was impressed by the Yōshin-ryū practitioners and realized that he might never be able to beat someone as talented as Totsuka simply by training harder: he also needed to train smarter. It was this experience that first led Kanō to believe that to be truly superior, one needed to combine the best elements of several ryū, or schools, of jūjutsu including Yagyu Shingan-ryū Taijutsu. Toward this end, he began to seek teachers who could provide him with superior elements of jūjutsu that he could adopt.

After Iso died in 1881, Kanō began training in Kitō-ryū with Iikubo Tsunetoshi (Kōnen). Iikubo was an expert in kata and throwing, and fond of randori. Kanō applied himself thoroughly to learning Kitō-ryū, believing Iikubo's throwing techniques in particular to be better than in the schools he had previously studied. It is Iikubo who issued Kanō's only verified jūjutsu rank and teaching credential, namely a certificate of Menkyo (not Menkyo kaiden) in Nihonden Kitō Jūdō, dated October 1883.

Kodokan judo

Establishment

During the early 1880s, there was no clear separation between the jūjutsu that Kanō was teaching and the jūjutsu that his teachers had taught in the past. Kanō's Kitō-ryū teacher, Iikubo Tsunetoshi, came to Kanō's classes two or three times a week to support Kanō's teaching. Eventually student and master began to exchange places, and Kanō began to defeat Iikubo during randori:

To name his system, Kanō revived a term that Terada Kan'emon, the fifth headmaster of the Kitō-ryū, had adopted when he founded his own style, the Jikishin-ryū: "jūdō". The name combined the characters , meaning "pliancy", and dō, which is literally "The Way", but figuratively meaning 'method.'

From a technical standpoint, Kanō combined the throwing techniques of the Kitō-ryū and the choking and pinning techniques of the Tenjin Shin'yō-ryū. As such, judo's Koshiki no Kata preserves the traditional forms of the Kitō-ryū with only minor differences from the mainline tradition. Similarly, many of the techniques (but not the forms) of the Tenjin Shin'yō-ryū are preserved in the Kime no Kata.

Kanō's initial work was influenced by various methods and institutions. As he wrote in 1898, "By taking together all the good points I had learned of the various schools and adding thereto my own inventions and discoveries, I devised a new system for physical culture and moral training as well as for winning contests." However, after judo was introduced into the Japanese public schools, a process that took place between 1906 and 1917, there was increasing standardization of kata and tournament technique.

Development

Kanō also oversaw the development and growth of his judo organization, the Kodokan Judo Institute. This was a remarkable effort in itself, as the Kodokan's enrollment grew from fewer than a dozen students in 1882 to more than a thousand dan-graded members by 1911.

Kanō had only a handful of students at this time, but they improved their technique through regular contests with local police jūjutsu teams.

The Kodokan moved to a 60-mat space in April 1890. In December 1893, the Kodokan started moving to a larger space located in Tomizaka-cho, Koishikawa-cho, and the move was completed by February 1894.

The Kodokan's first kangeiko, or winter training, took place at the Tomizaka-cho dojo during the winter of 1894–1895. Midsummer training, or shochugeiko, started in 1896.  "In order to inure the pupil to the two extremes of heat and cold and to cultivate the virtue of perseverance", Britain's E.J. Harrison wrote:

During the late 1890s, the Kodokan moved two more times; first to a 207-mat space in November 1897, and then to a 314-mat space in January 1898. In 1909, Kanō incorporated the Kodokan, and endowed it with 10,000 yen (then about US$4,700). The reason, said Japan Times on 30 March 1913, was "so that this wonderful institution might be able to reconstruct, for that is what it really does, the moral and physical nature of the Japanese youth, without its founder's personal attention."

The Kodokan moved once again during Kanō's lifetime, and on 21 March 1934, the Kodokan dedicated this 510-mat facility. Guests at the opening included the Belgian, Italian, and Afghan ambassadors to Japan. In 1958, when the Kodokan moved to its current eight story facility, that now has more than 1200 mats, the old building was sold to the Japan Karate Association.

Ideals
On 18 April 1888, Kanō and Reverend Thomas Lindsay presented a lecture called "Jiujitsu: The Old Samurai Art of Fighting without Weapons" to the Asiatic Society of Japan. This lecture took place at the British Embassy in Tokyo. Its theme was that the main principle of judo involved gaining victory by yielding to strength.

Being an idealist, Kanō had broad aims for judo, which he saw as something that simultaneously encompassed self-defense, physical culture, and moral behavior.

In 1915, Kanō gave this definition to judo:

In 1918, Kanō added:

During March 1922, Kanō brought all this to fruition through the introduction of the Kodokan Bunkakai, or Kodokan Cultural Association. This organization held its first meeting at Tokyo's Seiyoken Hotel on 5 April 1922, and held its first public lecture three days later at the YMCA hall in Kanda. The mottoes of the Kodokan Cultural Association were "Good Use of Spiritual and Physical Strength" and "Prospering in Common for Oneself and Others." Although those are literal translations, the phrases were usually translated into English as "Maximum Efficiency with Minimum Effort" and "Mutual Welfare and Benefit." The theories of this organization were described in some detail in an article published in an American magazine Living Age in September 1922.

Professional life

Educator
Although Kanō promoted judo whenever he could, he earned his living as an educator.

Kanō entered Tokyo Imperial University during June 1877. He majored in political science and economics, which at that time were taught by the Department of Aesthetics and Morals. He graduated in July 1882, and the following month he began work as a professor, fourth class, at the Gakushuin, or Peers School, in Tokyo. In 1883, Kanō was appointed professor of economics at Komaba Agricultural College (now the Faculty of Agriculture at University of Tokyo), but during April 1885, he returned to Gakushuin, with the position of principal.

In January 1891, Kanō was appointed to a position at the Ministry of Education. In August 1891, he gave up this position to become a dean at the Fifth Higher Normal School (present-day Kumamoto University). One of the teachers at Fifth Higher between 1891 and 1893 was Lafcadio Hearn. Around this same time, Kanō married. His wife, Sumako Takezoe, was the daughter of a former Japanese ambassador to Korea. Eventually, the couple had six daughters and three sons.

During the summer of 1892, Kanō went to Shanghai to help establish a program that would allow Chinese students to study in Japan. Kanō revisited Shanghai during 1905, 1915, and 1921.

In January 1898, Kanō was appointed director of primary education at the Ministry of Education, and in August 1899, he received a grant that allowed him to study in Europe. His ship left Yokohama on 13 September 1899, and he arrived in Marseilles on 15 October. He spent about a year in Europe, and during this trip, he visited Paris, Berlin, Brussels, Amsterdam, and London. He returned to Japan in 1901. Soon after returning to Japan, he resumed his post as president of Tokyo Higher Normal School, and he remained in this position until his retirement on 16 January 1920. He also helped establish Nada Middle High School in 1928 at Kobe, which later became one of highest-ranked private high schools in Japan.

Considering that he majored in political science and economics, Kanō's family thought that after graduating from university, he would pursue a career in some government ministry. Indeed, through influential friends of his father's, he was initially offered a position with the Ministry of Finance. However, his love for teaching led him instead to accept a position teaching at Gakushuin. The students of Japan's elite attended Gakushuin and were of higher social positions than their teachers. The students were allowed to ride in rickshaws (jinrikisha) right to the doors of the classes, whereas teachers were forbidden. The teachers often felt compelled to visit the homes of these students whenever summoned to give instruction or advice. In effect, the teachers were treated as servants.

Kanō believed this to be unacceptable. He refused to play such a subservient role when teaching his students. To Kanō, a teacher must command respect. At the same time, he employed the latest European and American pedagogical methods. The theories of the American educator John Dewey especially influenced him. Kanō's manner had the desired effect upon the students, but the administration was slower to warm to his methods and it was not until the arrival of a new principal that Kanō's ideas found acceptance.

All this is to say that Kanō's educational philosophy was a combination of both traditional Japanese neo-Confucianism and contemporary European and American philosophies, to include Instrumentalism, Utilitarianism, and "evolutionary progressivism", as Social Darwinism was then known.

The goals of Kanō's educational philosophies and methods (indeed, the goals of most Japanese educational programs of the early 20th century) were: to develop minds, bodies, and spirits in equal proportion; to increase patriotism and loyalty, especially to the Emperor; to teach public morality; and to increase physical strength and stamina, especially for the purpose of making young men more fit for military service.

Calisthenics, especially as done in the huge formations favored at the time, could be boring, and at the high school and college levels, games such as baseball and rugby were more often spectator sports than a practical source of physical exercise for the masses. Moreover, at elite levels, baseball, football, and even judo did not put much emphasis on moral or intellectual development. Instead, elite coaches and athletes tended to emphasize winning, at almost any cost.

For Kanō, the answer to this conundrum was one word: judo. Not judo in the sense of simply throwing other people around, and definitely not judo in the sense of winning at any cost. Instead, it was judo in the sense of "Maximum Efficiency with Minimum Effort" and "Mutual Welfare and Benefit." Or, as Kanō himself put it to a reporter in 1938: "When yielding is the highest efficient use of energy, then yielding is judo."

International Olympic Committee

Kanō became active in the work of the International Olympic Committee (IOC) in 1909. This came about after Kristian Hellström of the Swedish Olympic Committee wrote to the governments of Japan and China to ask if they were going to send teams to the 1912 Olympics. The Japanese government did not want to embarrass itself on an international stage by saying no, so the Ministry of Education was told to look into this. The Ministry logically turned to Kanō, who was a physical educator with recent experience in Europe. Kanō agreed to represent Japan at the International Olympics Committee, and, after talking to the French ambassador to Japan and reading pamphlets sent by the Swedes, developed, in his words, "a fairly good idea of what the Olympic Games were."

Toward fulfilling his duties as a member, in 1912, Kanō helped establish the Japan Amateur Athletic Association (Dai Nippon Tai-iku Kyokai), which had the mission of overseeing amateur sport in Japan. Kanō was the official representative of Japan to the Olympics in Stockholm in 1912, and he was involved in organizing the Far Eastern Championship Games held in Osaka during May 1917. In 1920, Kanō represented Japan at the Antwerp Olympics, and during the early 1920s, he served on the Japanese Council of Physical Education. He did not play much part in organizing the Far Eastern Championship Games held in Osaka in May 1923, nor did he attend the 1924 Olympics in Paris, but he did represent Japan at the Olympics in Amsterdam (1928), Los Angeles (1932), and Berlin (1936). From 1931 to 1938, he was also one of the leading international spokesmen in Japan's bid for the 1940 Olympics.

Kanō's chief goal in all this was, in his words, to gather people together for a common cause, with friendly feeling. His goals did not, however, particularly involve getting judo into the Olympics. As he put it in a letter to Britain's Gunji Koizumi in 1936:

Death and legacy
In 1934, Kanō stopped giving public exhibitions. The reason was his failing health, probably compounded by kidney stones. The British judoka Sarah Mayer  wrote "People don’t seem to think he will live much longer" to her friends in London. Nevertheless, Kanō continued attending important Kodokan events such as kagami-biraki (New Years' ceremonies) whenever he could, and he continued participating in Olympics business.

In May 1938, Kanō died at sea, during a voyage that he made as member of the IOC on board the NYK Line motor ship Hikawa Maru. Because the Japanese merchant fleet of the 1930s used Tokyo time wherever it was in the world, the Japanese date of death was 4 May 1938 at about 5:33 am JST, whereas the international date of death was 3 May 1938 at 20:33 UTC. The cause of death was officially listed as pneumonia. but other sources list food poisoning as the cause of death. During the 1990s, there appeared allegations that Kanō was murdered by poisoning rather than dying of pneumonia.  Although there is no known contemporary documentation to support this claim, Kanō's opposition to Japanese militarism was well-known, and many others who also opposed it were allegedly assassinated.

Judo did not die with Kanō. Instead, during the 1950s, judo clubs sprang up throughout the world, and in 1964, judo was introduced as an Olympic sport in the Tokyo Olympics, and was reintroduced at the Munich Olympics in 1972. Kanō's posthumous reputation was therefore assured. Nonetheless, his true legacy was his idealism. As Kanō said in a speech given in 1934, "Nothing under the sun is greater than education. By educating one person and sending him into the society of his generation, we make a contribution extending a hundred generations to come."

Kanō has also been compared to the 9th Marquess of Queensberry in the way his legacy left a whole new set of rules:

Honors
 Order of the Rising Sun, Gold Rays with Neck Ribbon, 1938 (Japan).

On 28 October 2021, Google celebrated Jigorō's 161st birth anniversary with a doodle on its homepage.

Published works
 Kanō, Jigorō. (October 1898 – December 1903). Kokushi.
 Lindsay, Thomas and Kanō, Jigorō. (1889, 1915 reprint). "The Old Samurai Art of Fighting without Weapons", Transactions of the Asiatic Society of Japan, XVI, Pt II, pp. 202–217.
 Kanō, Jigorō. (Jan. 1915 – December 1918). Jūdō.
 Kanō, Jigorō. (1922). "Jiudo: The Japanese Art of Self Defence", Living Age, 314, pp. 724–731.
 Kanō, Jigorō. (1932). "The Contribution of Judo to Education", Journal of Health and Physical Education, 3, pp. 37–40, 58 (originally a lecture given at the University of Southern California on the occasion of the Xth Olympiad).
 Kanō, Jigorō. (1934). "Principles of Judo and Their Applications to All Phases of Human Activity", unpublished lecture given at the Parnassus Society, Athens, Greece, on 5 June 1934, reprinted as "Principles of Judo" in Budokwai Quarterly Bulletin, April 1948, pp. 37–42.
 Kanō, Jigorō. (1936). "Olympic Games and Japan", Dai Nippon, pp. 197–199. In Thomas A. Green and Joseph R. Svinth, eds., Martial Arts in the Modern World. Westport, Connecticut: Greenwood, 2003, pp. 167–172.
 Kanō, Jigorō. (1937). Judo (jujutsu) by Prof. Jigorō Kanō. Tokyo: Board of Tourist Industry, Japanese Government Railways.
 Kanō, Jigorō. (1937). "Jujutsu and Judo; What Are They?" Tokyo: Kodokwan.
 Kanō, Jigorō. (Undated). Jujutsu Becomes Judo.
 Kanō, Jigorō. (1972). Kanō Jigorō, watakushi no shōgai to jūdō. Tokyo: Shin Jinbutsu Oraisha. 
 Kanō, Jigorō. (1983). Kanō Jigorō chosakushū. Tokyo: Gogatsu Shobo. 
 Kanō, Jigorō. (1986). Kodokan judo/Jigorō Kanō; edited under the supervision of the Kodokan Editorial Committee. Tokyo and New York: Kodansha International.
 Kanō, Jigorō. (1995). Kanō Jigorō taikei/kanshū Kōdōkan. Tokyo: Hon no Tomosha.
 Kanō, Jigorō. (2013). Mind over muscle – writings from the founder of judo Kodansha USA, English translation from Japanese anthology 2005

See also
 Hard and soft (martial arts)
Idaten (TV series)
 Judo technique
 Kosen judo
 Kuzushi
 Matsugoro Okuda
 The Principle of Ju
 Sanshiro Sugata
 Statue of Kanō Jigorō, Shinjuku

Notes

References

Sources

External links

 Articles by and about Kano Jigoro
 National Diet Library photos and biography
 Koshiki no kata Kanō Jigorō with Yamashita Yoshitsugu
 
 Videos of Kano Jigoro (judovision.org)
 The life and Writings of Jigoro Kano, Founder of Judo. (thejudopodcast.eu)
 The life and Writings of Jigoro Kano, Founder of Judo. Part 2 (thejudopodcast.eu)

1860 births
1938 deaths
International Olympic Committee members
Japanese male judoka
Japanese jujutsuka
Judo
Martial arts school founders
Martial arts writers
People from Kobe
Jacket Wrestlers
People who died at sea
Recipients of the Order of the Rising Sun, 3rd class
University of Tokyo alumni